Carolina Erba (born 8 March 1985) is an Italian foil fencer, team World and European champion in 2013. She earned three bronze medals in the Fencing World Cup: at Seoul in 2013 and at Marseilles in 2013 and 2014.

Erba is engaged to Valerio Aspromonte, who is a member of Italy's senior foil team.

References

External links

 Profile at the Italian Fencing Federation
 Profile at the European Fencing Confederation

1985 births
Living people
Italian female fencers
Italian foil fencers
People from Busto Arsizio
Fencers at the 2015 European Games
European Games medalists in fencing
European Games bronze medalists for Italy
Mediterranean Games bronze medalists for Italy
Mediterranean Games medalists in fencing
Competitors at the 2013 Mediterranean Games
Sportspeople from the Province of Varese
21st-century Italian women